Manhattan is a 1979 American romantic comedy-drama film directed by Woody Allen and produced by Charles H. Joffe from a screenplay written by Allen and Marshall Brickman. Allen co-stars as a twice-divorced 42-year-old comedy writer who dates a 17-year-old girl (Mariel Hemingway) but falls in love with his best friend's (Michael Murphy) mistress (Diane Keaton). Meryl Streep and Anne Byrne also star.

Manhattan was Allen's first movie filmed in black-and-white, and was shot in 2.35:1 widescreen. It features music by George Gershwin, including Rhapsody in Blue, which inspired the film. Allen described the film as a combination of Annie Hall and Interiors.

The film received critical acclaim and was nominated for the Academy Award for Best Supporting Actress for Hemingway and Best Writing, Screenplay Written Directly for the Screen for Allen and Brickman. Its North American box-office receipts of $39.9 million made it Allen's second biggest box-office hit (adjusted for inflation). It ranks 46th on AFI's 100 Years...100 Laughs list and number 63 on Bravo's "100 Funniest Movies". In 2001, the United States Library of Congress deemed the film "culturally, historically, or aesthetically significant" and selected it for preservation in the National Film Registry.

Plot
The film opens with a montage of images of Manhattan and other parts of New York City accompanied by George Gershwin's Rhapsody in Blue, with Isaac Davis narrating drafts of an introduction to a book about a man who loves the city. Isaac is a twice-divorced, 42-year-old television comedy writer who quits his boring job. He is dating Tracy, a 17-year-old girl attending the Dalton School. His best friend, college professor Yale Pollack, married to Emily, is having an affair with Mary Wilkie. Mary's ex-husband and former teacher, Jeremiah, also appears, and Isaac's ex-wife Jill is writing a confessional book about their marriage. Jill, who before their marriage told Isaac that she was bisexual, has since come out and lives with her lesbian partner, Connie.

When Isaac meets Mary, her cultural snobbery offends him. Isaac runs into her again at an Equal Rights Amendment fund-raising event at the Museum of Modern Art hosted by Bella Abzug and escorts her home. They chat until sunrise in a sequence that culminates in a shot of the Queensboro Bridge. In spite of a growing attraction to Mary, Isaac continues his relationship with Tracy but emphasizes that theirs cannot be a serious relationship and encourages her to go to London to study acting.

After Yale breaks up with Mary, he suggests that Isaac ask her out. Isaac does, always having felt that Tracy was too young for him. Isaac breaks up with Tracy, much to her distress, and before long, Mary has virtually moved into his apartment. Emily is curious about Isaac's new girlfriend. The two couples enjoy a day out and upon walking down a street Isaac spots Jill's new book, Marriage, Divorce, and Selfhood. Emily proceeds to read parts of the book aloud, including passages about a ménage à trois Isaac had with Jill and another woman, and an incident where Isaac attempted to run Connie over, much to Mary and Yale's amusement. Publicly humiliated, Isaac confronts Jill, who responds nonchalantly and mentions a film rights deal she has acquired. Upon returning home, Isaac learns from Mary that she is returning to Yale and wants to break up. A furious Isaac confronts Yale at the college where he teaches, and Yale argues that he found Mary first. Isaac discusses Yale's extramarital affairs with Emily and learns that Yale told her Isaac introduced Mary to him.

In the dénouement, Isaac lies on his sofa, musing into a tape recorder about the things that make "life worth living". When he finds himself saying "Tracy's face", he sets down the microphone. Unable to reach her by phone, he sets out for Tracy's on foot. He arrives at her family's apartment building just as she is leaving for London. He asks her not to go and says he does not want "that thing about [her] that [he] like[s]" to change. She replies that the plans have already been made and reassures him that "not everybody gets corrupted" before saying "you have to have a little faith in people". He gives her a slight smile, with a final look to the camera then segueing into final shots of the skyline with some bars of Rhapsody in Blue playing again. An instrumental version of "Embraceable You" plays over the credits.

Cast

Production

Development
According to Allen, the idea for Manhattan originated from his love of Gershwin's music. He was listening to one of the composer's albums of overtures and thought, "this would be a beautiful thing to make ... a movie in black and white ... a romantic movie". Allen has said that Manhattan was "like a mixture of what I was trying to do with Annie Hall and Interiors" and that it deals with the problem of people trying to live a decent existence in an essentially junk-obsessed contemporary culture without selling out, admitting that he himself could conceive of giving away all of his "possessions to charity and living in much more modest circumstances," adding that he has "rationalized [his] way out of it so far, but [he] could conceive of doing it."

Babi Christina Engelhardt has said that the film was partially based on her relationship with Allen, which began soon after they met at a restaurant in New York in 1976. But actress Stacey Nelkin believes the character of Tracy is based on her. Engelhardt later said she presumes that Tracy is a composite of Nelkin, herself and "any number" of other young girls Allen was sleeping with at the time.

Filming
Allen talked to cinematographer Gordon Willis about how fun it would be to shoot the film in black and white, Panavision aspect ratio (2.35:1) because it would give "a great look at New York City, which is sort of one of the characters in the film". Allen decided to shoot his film in black and white because that was how he remembered it from when he was small. "Maybe it's a reminiscence from old photographs, films, books and all that. But that's how I remember New York." The film was shot on location with the exception of some of the scenes in the planetarium, which were filmed on a set.

The famous bridge shot was done at five in the morning. The production had to bring their own bench as there were no park benches at the location. The bridge had two sets of necklace lights on a timer controlled by the city. When the sun came up, the bridge lights went off. Willis made arrangements with the city to leave the lights on and that he would let them know when they got the shot. Afterward, they could be turned off. As they started to shoot the scene, one string of bridge lights went out, and Allen was forced to use that take.

After finishing the film, Allen was very unhappy with it and asked United Artists not to release it. He offered to make a film for no fee instead. He later said, "I just thought to myself, 'At this point in my life, if this is the best I can do, they shouldn't give me money to make movies.'"

Music

All titles of the soundtrack were compositions by George Gershwin. They were performed by the New York Philharmonic under Zubin Mehta and the Buffalo Philharmonic under Michael Tilson Thomas.
 New York Philharmonic
 Rhapsody in Blue
 "Love is Sweeping the Country"
 "Land of the Gay Caballero"
 "Sweet and Low Down"
 "I've Got a Crush on You"
 "Do-Do-Do"
 "'S Wonderful"
 "Oh, Lady Be Good!"
 "Strike Up the Band"
 "Embraceable You"
 Buffalo Philharmonic
 "Someone to Watch Over Me"
 "He Loves and She Loves"
 "But Not for Me"
A part of the first movement of Mozart's Symphony No. 40 is heard in a concert scene.

Release
Manhattan premiered at the Ziegfeld Theatre in New York City on April 18, 1979. It opened in 27 theaters in New York City, Los Angeles and Toronto on April 25, then expanded to an additional 256 theaters nationwide on May 4, before adding a further 117 screens a week later. The film was shown out of competition at the 1979 Cannes Film Festival in May.

Reception

Box office
The film grossed $485,734 ($16,749 per screen) in its opening weekend and after expanding nationwide, it had grossed $3.5 million after 13 days. It grossed $39.9 million in its entire run in the United States and Canada, making the film the 17th highest-grossing picture of the year. Adjusted for ticket price inflation (as of 2017), Manhattan grossed $141,484,800, making it Allen's second biggest box-office hit, following 1977's Annie Hall.

Critical response
The film received largely positive reviews and holds a rating of 94% "Certified Fresh" on Rotten Tomatoes based on reviews from 68 critics, with an average rating of 8.5/10. The website's consensus reads, "One of Woody Allen's early classics, Manhattan combines modern, bittersweet humor and timeless romanticism with unerring grace." Gary Arnold, in The Washington Post, wrote: "Manhattan has comic integrity in part because Allen is now making jokes at the expense of his own parochialism. There's no opportunity to heap condescending abuse on the phonies and sell-outs decorating the Hollywood landscape. The result appears to be a more authentic and magnanimous comic perception of human vanity and foolhardiness." In his review for Newsweek magazine, Jack Kroll wrote: "Allen's growth in every department is lovely to behold. He gets excellent performances from his cast. The increasing visual beauty of his films is part of their grace and sweetness, their balance between Allen's yearning romanticism and his tough eye for the fatuous and sentimental – a balance also expressed in his best screen play [sic] yet." In his review for the Chicago Sun-Times, Roger Ebert, who gave the film four stars out of four, wrote, "Diane Keaton gives us a fresh and nicely edged New York intellectual. And Mariel Hemingway deserves some kind of special award for what's in some ways the most difficult role in the film." Ebert included the film in his list of The Great Movies. Gene Siskel of the Chicago Tribune awarded a full four out of four stars, calling it "a remarkable motion picture. 'Manhattan' may turn out to be the year's best comedy and drama." Vincent Canby of The New York Times called the film "extraordinarily fine and funny" with "superb" performances from Keaton and Hemingway. Charles Champlin of the Los Angeles Times called it "harder, harsher, crueler, deeper-going, more assertive but in the end no less life-affirming than 'Annie Hall,'" and declared Manhattan "even better" than that film. Stanley Kauffmann of The New Republic wrote, "Manhattan is a faulty film, but it's moderately amusing".

Alexander Walker of the London Evening Standard wrote: "So precisely nuanced is the speech, so subtle the behaviour of a group of friends, lovers, mistresses and cuckolds who keep splitting up and pairing off like unstable molecules". In 2007 J. Hoberman wrote in The Village Voice: "The New York City that Woody so tediously defended in Annie Hall was in crisis. And so he imagined an improved version. More than that, he cast this shining city in the form of those movies that he might have seen as a child in Coney Island—freeing the visions that he sensed to be locked up in the silver screen."

In October 2013, readers of The Guardian newspaper voted it the best film directed by Woody Allen.

Accolades
New York Film Critics Circle named Allen best director for Manhattan. The National Society of Film Critics also named Allen best director along with Robert Benton, who directed Kramer vs. Kramer. The film was nominated for Academy Awards for Best Supporting Actress (Mariel Hemingway) and Best Original Screenplay (Allen and Marshall Brickman). It also won the BAFTA Award for Best Film and the César Award for Best Foreign Film.

In Empire magazine's 2008 poll of the 500 greatest movies ever made, Manhattan was ranked number 76. The New York Times placed the film on its Best 1000 Movies Ever list. The film was number 63 on Bravo's "100 Funniest Movies".  In 2001, the United States Library of Congress deemed it "culturally, historically or aesthetically significant" and selected it for preservation in the National Film Registry. It is also ranked No. 4 on Rotten Tomatoes' 25 Best Romantic Comedies.

The film is recognized by American Film Institute in these lists:
 1998: AFI's 100 Years...100 Movies – Nominated
 2000: AFI's 100 Years...100 Laughs – #46
 2002: AFI's 100 Years...100 Passions – #66
 2005: AFI's 100 Years...100 Movie Quotes:
 Isaac Davis: "I think people should mate for life, like pigeons or Catholics." – Nominated
 2007: AFI's 100 Years...100 Movies (10th Anniversary Edition) – Nominated

Home media
Allen wanted to preserve Willis's compositions and insisted that the aspect ratio be preserved when the film was released on video (an unusual request in a time when widescreen films were normally panned and scanned for TV and video release).  As a result, all copies of the film on video (and most television broadcasts) were letterboxed, originally with a gray border.

Manhattan was first released on Blu-ray on January 24, 2012, alongside Allen's 1977 film Annie Hall. Both releases included the films' original theatrical trailer.

Legacy
Manhattans screenplay was performed in front of a live audience at the Los Angeles County Museum of Art on November 15, 2012, as part of Jason Reitman's Live Read series. Actors read the script, narrowed to six speaking parts, and still photographs from the movie were projected behind them. The cast included  Stephen Merchant as Isaac Davis, Olivia Munn as Mary Wilkie, Shailene Woodley as Tracy, Michael Murphy as Yale Pollack, Mae Whitman as Emily Pollack, Erika Christensen as Jill Davis and Jason Mantzoukas as Dennis. In keeping with the project's focus on impermanence and spontaneity, there were no rehearsals, shows were announced only days prior, and the names of some cast members were withheld entirely; performances were not recorded.

Manhattan inspired the song "Remember Manhattan" written by Richard Marx and Fee Waybill from Marx's debut album.

Manhattan's portrayal of a middle-aged man dating a teenager, which drew little criticism at the time of its release, attracted more scrutiny in the late 2010s as Allen's reputation came into question in the wake of renewed allegations by his daughter Dylan Farrow.

References

Bibliography

External links

 
 
 
 
 
 
 The Reeler interview with Gordon Willis

1979 films
1979 comedy-drama films
1979 LGBT-related films
1979 romantic drama films
1970s American films
1970s English-language films
1970s romantic comedy-drama films
American black-and-white films
American LGBT-related films
American romantic comedy-drama films
Best Film BAFTA Award winners
Best Foreign Film César Award winners
Female bisexuality in film
Films about adultery in the United States
Films about writers
Films directed by Woody Allen
Films produced by Charles H. Joffe
Films set in Manhattan
Films set in museums
Films shot in New York City
Films whose writer won the Best Screenplay BAFTA Award
Films with screenplays by Marshall Brickman
Films with screenplays by Woody Allen
George Gershwin in film
Juvenile sexuality in films
Lesbian-related films
LGBT-related romantic comedy-drama films
Museums in popular culture
United Artists films
United States National Film Registry films